Although many people have a fear of mushroom poisoning by "toadstools", only a small number of the many macroscopic fruiting bodies commonly known as mushrooms and toadstools have proven fatal to humans.

This list is not exhaustive and does not contain many fungi that, although not deadly, are still harmful. For a less-detailed list of fungi that include non-deadly poisonous species, see List of poisonous fungi.

Fungi with significant risk of death if consumed

Fungi where isolated deaths have been reported

See also
 List of poisonous fungus species
 Mycotoxicology

Footnotes

Deadly fungi, List of